Lars Svante Albert Lindqvist (born 26 April 1948) is a Swedish historian who was the Marshal of the Realm of Sweden and chief of the Royal Court of Sweden from 1 January 2010 until 30 August 2018. Since 1 September 2018 he is appointed Chancellor of the Royal Orders of Knighthood, the chancery overseeing the Orders, decorations, and medals of Sweden.

Biography 
Lindqvist is the son of architect Åke E. Lindqvist and Barbro Åström. He holds an MSE in engineering physics from the Royal Institute of Technology since 1977. After contact with Torsten Althin, he had written a thesis with focus on historical technology. He holds a Ph.D in science and ideas history from Uppsala University since 1984. His doctoral dissertation was about the introduction of the steam engine in Sweden in the early 18th century.

Lindqvist later became a professor of art history at the Royal Institute of Technology, but left in 1998 to become head of the Nobel Museum, which was inaugurated in 2001.

Lindqvist is a member of the Royal Swedish Academy of Engineering Sciences since 1992, the Royal Swedish Academy of Sciences (KVA) since 1994, the Royal Swedish Academy of Letters, History and Antiquities since 2002, and the American Philosophical Society since 2013.

On 1 July 2009 he was appointed the KVA's praeses, for a three-year term. He was succeeded by Barbara Cannon on 1 July 2012.

Distinctions 
 H. M. The King's Medal of the 12th size in the Order of the Seraphim ribbon (Kong: sGM12mserafb) "for significant contributions in the museum sector and in the subject of technology history," on 28 January 2010.
 Member 1st Class of Order of the Cross of Terra Mariana (EPTMk1kl) in connection with the Estonian state visit on 18 January 2011.
 Knight Grand Cross of the Order of Merit of the Italian Republic (14 January 2019)

References

External links 

 http://www.svantelindqvist.com/

|-

Academic staff of the KTH Royal Institute of Technology
Members of the Royal Swedish Academy of Engineering Sciences
Members of the Royal Swedish Academy of Sciences
KTH Royal Institute of Technology alumni
Uppsala University alumni
1948 births
Living people
20th-century Swedish historians
Historians of technology
Writers from Stockholm
Marshals of the Realm
Leonardo da Vinci Medal recipients
Members of the American Philosophical Society